Freesound is a collaborative repository of Creative Commons licensed audio samples, and non-profit organisation, with more than 500,000 sounds and effects (as of May 2021), and 8 million registered users (as of March 2019). Sounds are uploaded to the website by its users, and cover a wide range of subjects, from field recordings to synthesised sounds. Audio content in the repository can be tagged and browsed by folksonomic means as well as standard text-based search. Audio content in the repository is also analysed using the open-source audio analysis tool Essentia, which powers the similarity search functionality of the site.
Freesound has a RESTful API through which third-party applications can access and retrieve audio content and its metadata.

Licensing
Freesound originally used the CC Sampling Plus license for all samples, but has since switched to using CC0, CC BY, and CC BY-NC. Older samples remain under Sampling Plus unless their uploaders have relicensed them.

All of these licenses allow use and distribution of the samples (modified or unmodified) for non-commercial purposes, and in the case of CC0 and CC BY also for commercial purposes. The Sampling Plus license does not allow unmodified samples to be distributed commercially, and therefore, like CC BY-NC, fails the Definition of Free Cultural Works and the Debian Free Software Guidelines, and is not free enough to be used on Wikipedia, free software programs, and other projects requiring free content.

Release
The Freesound Project was officially launched on April 5, 2005 in the context of the 2005 International Computer Music Conference. It is a project of the Music Technology Group of Universitat Pompeu Fabra, Barcelona. Frederic Font is heading the team responsible for developing and administrating the Freesound website.

Children of Men was the first major motion picture known to legally use a sample from Freesound in its production. The sound used was "male_Thijs_loud_scream.aiff" posted by the user thanvannispen, and the film properly attributes the sample in the credits.

Features
Metadata tags
GeoTagging
Sample packs
Remix tree
Similarity search
Sound Bookmarks
Forum
Follow users and tags
Waveform display
HTML5/Flash preview
RESTful API
CC licensing

The features of Freesound are designed to make the sound files on the website easy to index, search, and browse. Since the licenses used (except CC0) stipulate that the authors of the original work must be credited in the derivative work, the site is capable of automatically generating an attribution list to make this easier.

Software architecture
The Freesound platform is based on technology developed by the Music Technology Group of the Pompeu Fabra University, Barcelona.
Similarity searches based on automatically extracted audio features using Essentia audio analysis tool.
Spectral centroid waveform display

The following web technologies are also used:
Python scripting
PostgreSQL database
Apache Solr text search

References

External links
 
 Creative Commons interview with Bram de Jong
 Using Freesound with ccMixter

Open content projects
Projects established in 2005
Internet properties established in 2005
2005 establishments in Spain
Creative Commons-licensed databases
Stock media